Gahai Township (Mandarin: 尕海镇) is a township in Luqu County, Gannan Tibetan Autonomous Prefecture, Gansu, China. In 2010, Gahai Township had a total population of 5,257: 2,666 males and 2,591 females: 1,383 aged under 14, 3,553 aged between 15 and 65 and 321 aged over 65.

References 

Gannan Tibetan Autonomous Prefecture